Asrar-i-Khudi (The Secrets of the Self; published in Persian, 1915) was the first philosophical poetry book of Allama Iqbal, the great poet-philosopher of British India. This book deals mainly with the individual, while his second book Rumuz-i-Bekhudi  discusses the interaction between the  individual and society.

Introduction
Published in 1915, Asrar-i-Khudi (Secrets of the Self) was the first poetry book of Iqbal. Considered by many to be Iqbal's best book of poetry, it is concerned with the philosophy of religion. In a letter to the poet Ghulam Qadir Girami (d.1345/1927), Iqbal wrote that    "the ideas behind the verses had never been expressed before either in the East or in the West." R.A. Nicholson, who translated the Asrar as The Secrets of the Self, says it caught the attention of young Muslims as soon as it was printed. Iqbal wrote this in Persian because he felt the language was well-suited for the expression of these ideas.

Overview
In 1915, he published his first collection of poetry, the Asrar-e-Khudi (Secrets of the Self) in Persian. The poems emphasise the spirit and self from a religious, spiritual perspective. Many critics have called this Iqbal's finest poetic work  

In Asrar-e-Khudi, Iqbal has explained his philosophy of "Khudi," or "Self." Iqbal' s use of term "Khudi" is synonymous with the word of "Rooh" as mentioned in the Quran. "Rooh" is that divine spark which is present in every human being and was present in Adam for which God ordered all of the angels to prostrate in front of Adam. 

However, one has to make a great journey of transformation to realize that divine spark which Iqbal calls "Khudi". A similitude of this journey could be understood by the relationship of fragrance and seed. Every seed has the potential for fragrance within it. But to reach its fragrance the seed must go through all the different changes and stages. First breaking out of its shell. Then breaking the ground to come into the light developing roots at the same time. Then fighting against the elements to develop leaves and flowers. Finally reaching its pinnacle by attaining the fragrance that was hidden within it. 

In the same way, to reach one's khudi or rooh one needs to go through multiple stages which Iqbal himself went through, spiritual path which he encourages others to travel. He notes that not all seeds reach the level of fragrance. Many die along the way, incomplete. In the same way, only few people could climb this Mount Everest of spirituality, most get consumed along the way by materialism. The same concept had been used by the Medieval poet and philosopher Farid ud-Din Attar of Nishapur in his "Mantaq-ul-Tair" ("The Conference of the Birds").  

Iqbal proves by various means that the whole universe obeys the will of the "Self." He condemns self-destruction. For him, the aim of life is self-realization and self-knowledge. He charts the stages through which the "Self" has to pass before finally arriving at its point of perfection, enabling the knower of the "Self" to become the vicegerent of God.

Topics

Introduction
Prologue
Showing that the system of the universe originates in the Self, and that the continuation of the life of all individuals depends on strengthening the Self
Showing that the life of the Self comes from forming desires and bringing them to birth
Showing that the Self is strengthened by Love
Showing that the Self is weakened by asking
Showing that when the Self is strengthened by Love its gains dominion over the outward and inward forces of the universe
A tale of which the moral is that negation of the Self is a doctrine invented by the subject races of mankind in order that by this means they may sap and weaken the character of their roles
To the effect that Plato, whose thought has deeply influenced the mysticism and literature of Islam, followed the sheep's doctrine, and that we must be on our guard against his theories
Concerning the true nature of poetry and the reform of Islamic literature
Showing that the education of the self has three stages : Obedience, Self-control, and Divine Vicegerence
Setting forth the inner meanings of the names of Ali
Story of a young man of Merv who came to the saint Ali Hujwiri – God have mercy on him and complained that he was oppressed by the enemies
Story of the bird that was faint with thirst
Story of the diamond and the coal
Story of the Sheikh and the Brahmin, followed by a conversation between Ganges and Himalayas to the effect that the continuation of social life depends on firm attachment to the characteristic traditions of the community
Showing that the purpose of the Muslims 's like is to exalt the Word of Allah, and that the Jihad(to strive or to struggle), if it be prompted by land-hunger, is unlawful in the religion of Islam
Precepts written for the Muslims of India by Mir Naj«t Nakshbandi. Who is generally known as Baba Sahr'ai
Time is a sword
An invocation

Editions

See also 
 Index of Muhammad Iqbal–related articles
 Javid Nama
 Payam-i-Mashriq
 Zabur-i-Ajam
 Pas Chih Bayad Kard ay Aqwam-i-Sharq
 Bang-e-Dara
 Bal-e-Jibril
 Rumuz-e-Bekhudi
 Zarb-i-Kalim
 Armaghan-i-Hijaz

Notes

External links
Read online

Related Websites
 Official Website of Allama Iqbal
 Iqbal Cyber Library, Online Library
 The collection of Urdu poems: Columbia University
 Encyclopedia Britannica.
 Allama Iqbal Urdu Poetry Collection
 Allama Iqbal Searchable Books (iqbal.wiki)
 
 
 E-Books of Allama Iqbal on Rekhta
Social Media Pages
 Facebook Page of Allama Iqbal
 Twitter Account of Allama Iqbal
YouTube Channel
 YouTube Channel of Allama Iqbal

1915 poetry books
Persian poems
Islamic philosophical poetry books
Poetry by Muhammad Iqbal
Poetry collections
Persian-language books